Kouami Sacha Denanyoh (born 29 September 1979) is a Togolese judoka. He competed at the 2000 Summer Olympics, the 2008 Summer Olympics, and the 2012 Summer Olympics. At the 2008 Summer Olympics, he was choked unconscious with a clock choke by Sherali Bozorov in the preliminaries.

At the 2012 Summer Olympics, he lost in the second round to Islam Bozbayev.

He is now a teacher in a high school Gymnase intercantonal de la Broye and also gives judo classes for the University of Fribourg.

Achievements

References

External links
 

1979 births
Living people
Togolese male judoka
Judoka at the 2000 Summer Olympics
Judoka at the 2008 Summer Olympics
Judoka at the 2012 Summer Olympics
Olympic judoka of Togo
Competitors at the 2007 All-Africa Games
African Games competitors for Togo
21st-century Togolese people
20th-century Togolese people